Vincent's Club, known colloquially as Vinnie's, is a sports club predominantly but not exclusively for Oxford blues at Oxford University.

The club was founded in 1863 by oarsman Walter Bradford Woodgate (1841–1920) of Brasenose College, Oxford, and he was the first president of the club. Woodgate stated that Vincent's "should consist of the picked hundred of the University, selected for all-round qualities; social, physical and intellectual qualities being duly considered."

Vincent's Club is located in upstairs premises off the High Street at 1A King Edward Street in central Oxford. The Club was originally located in the old reading rooms which J. H. Vincent, a printer, had previously kept at 90 High Street. Members are elected for life. The club's constitution was amended to permit the admission of women on 9 March 2016.

Notable members 
Manon Johnes

Presidents

See also 
 Hawks' Club, the equivalent sports club at the University of Cambridge

References

External links 
 Vincent's Club website

Organizations established in 1863
Gentlemen's clubs in England
Oxford student sports clubs